Learning to Breathe is the fourth album by the American country music singer Larry Stewart. The final solo album of his career, it was released in 1999 on Windham Hill Records. "Still in Love", the only single, failed to chart. "Summer in the City" is a cover of a single originally recorded by The Lovin' Spoonful. After the album's release, Stewart rejoined Restless Heart in 2003, and has been a member since.

Stephen Thomas Erlewine rated the album three stars out of five in Allmusic, saying that he considered it to have a more adult contemporary radio-format sound than a country sound, but referring to Stewart's voice as "smooth [and] robust."

Track listing
"Take This Heart" (Larry Stewart, John Bettis, R.C. Bannon) – 4:55
"Anything Else but You" (Stewart, Michael Omartian, Bruce Sudano) – 3:45
"Learning to Breathe Again" (Omartian, Sudano) – 3:46
"In My Dreams Tonight" (Stewart, Jill Colucci, Stewart Harris) – 4:08
"Prodigal Daughter" (Stewart, Omartian) – 4:45
"Still in Love" (Stewart, Tommy Lee James) – 3:57
"Fantasy" (Stewart, Bannon) – 6:34
"Gotta Tell Somebody" (Stewart, Phillip Moore) – 4:29
"Compared to Goodbye" (Stewart, Moore) – 4:01
duet with Tabitha Fair
"Takin' My Time" (Stewart, Moore) – 5:07
"A Reason to Believe" (Stewart, Robert Ellis Orrall, Robert Hart) – 3:47
"Summer in the City" (Mark Sebastian, Steve Boone) – 4:13
intro: "In the Hall of the Mountain King" by Edvard Grieg

Personnel
As listed in liner notes.
Mike Brignardello – bass guitar
Mark Douthit – saxophone
Tabitha Fair – background vocals
Billy Gaines – background vocals
Vince Gill – electric guitar
John Hammond – drums
Tom Hemby – electric guitar
B. James Lowry – acoustic guitar
Michael McDonald – background vocals
Chris McHugh – drums
Jerry McPherson – electric guitar
Michael Mellett – background vocals
Gene Miller – background vocals
Michael Omartian – piano, organ, synthesizer, accordion, programming
Tiffany Palmer – background vocals
Chris Rodriguez – background vocals, electric guitar
Nicol Smith – background vocals
Jimmie Lee Sloas – bass guitar
Micah Wilshire – background vocals

Strings performed by the Nashville String Machine, contracted by Carl Gorodetzky and arranged by Michael Omartian.

References

1999 albums
Albums produced by Michael Omartian
Windham Hill Records albums
Larry Stewart (singer) albums